Les Riddle (born 28 December 1953) is an Australian basketball player. He competed in the men's tournament at the 1980 Summer Olympics.

References

External links
 

1953 births
Living people
Australian men's basketball players
1978 FIBA World Championship players
1982 FIBA World Championship players
Olympic basketball players of Australia
Basketball players at the 1980 Summer Olympics
Place of birth missing (living people)